Muhammad Kukuna was a Sultan of Kano who reigned from 1651-1652, and again from 1652-1660. His reign was interrupted in 1652 by Soyaki.

Biography in the Kano Chronicle
Below is a biography of Muhammad Kukuna from Palmer's 1908 English translation of the Kano Chronicle.

References

Monarchs of Kano